Vice Admiral Russell Harry Crane,  (born 11 June 1954) is a retired senior officer of the Royal Australian Navy (RAN), who served as the Chief of Navy from July 2008 until his retirement in June 2011.

Early life 
Crane was born in Southport, Queensland, on 11 June 1954 to Harry and Nina Crane. During his early teenage years, Crane was a cadet enlisted at the Naval Reserve Cadet unit "TS Tyalgum" at Main Beach on the Gold Coast.

Naval career 
Training as an Electrical Mechanic in aircraft communications, he was posted aboard the aircraft carrier  in 1971. Following selection for officer training in 1972, he began training as a Seaman Officer serving in numerous RAN establishments and ships, before receiving his commission. He was appointed as Minehunting Control Officer in the minehunter , in 1978 and promoted to lieutenant during the same year. In 1983 he was promoted to lieutenant commander and appointed in command of Curlew. He was later appointed as the executive officer of the destroyer escort , then in 1988, promoted to commander and posted to the Equipment Acquisition Division in Navy Office Canberra.

In 1993, Crane was posted as the commanding officer aboard , a destroyer escort based in Western Australia. He was promoted to captain in January 1996 and appointed as the Chief Staff Officer Command and Control, Communications and Intelligence in Maritime Headquarters. During his period in command Success conducted a number of deployments to the South East Asia region including, in September and October 1999, Operation Stabilise in support of peacekeeping operations in East Timor.

Awarded the Conspicuous Service Medal in early 2000 for his time in command HMAS Success, Crane was promoted to commodore in March 2000 and posted to Australian Defence Headquarters in Canberra as the Director General Intelligence, Surveillance, Reconnaissance and Electronic Warfare. He was Commander Australian Navy Systems Command from October 2001 before being promoted to rear admiral on 1 May 2004 and assuming duties as Director General Coastwatch and the inaugural Commander of the newly formed Joint Offshore Protection Command in March 2005. Crane became the Deputy Chief of Navy in June 2006, and was awarded a Member of the Order of Australia in June 2007.

Crane was promoted to vice admiral and succeeded Vice Admiral Russ Shalders as Chief of Navy on 4 July 2008. For his "distinguished service as Deputy Chief of Navy and as Chief of Navy", Crane was appointed an Officer of the Order of Australia in the 2010 Australia Day Honours. In February 2011, the RAN under Crane was embroiled in controversy when the Australian Defence Force was left with a critically reduced amphibious capability. Analysts claimed that a critical naval capability had been allowed to deteriorate to the point of failure.

On 24 May 2011, Crane was conferred Singapore's Meritorious Service Medal by Minister for Defence Ng Eng Hen at an investiture held at the Ministry of Defence. Crane stood down as Chief of Navy and retired from the RAN on 7 June 2011. For a number of personal reasons he specifically requested to retire on this date, nearly one month earlier than the intended 4 July Defence Chiefs change over, and five weeks prior to Crane's 41st anniversary of service with the RAN. He was presented with the French National Order of Merit by Vice Admiral Stephane Verwaerde, Deputy Chief of the French Navy, on 17 May 2013.

Honours and awards

References

External links 

Official photo (copyright)
Defence Leaders page entry

1954 births
Military personnel from Queensland
Australian military personnel of the International Force for East Timor
Chiefs of Navy (Australia)
Commanders of the Legion of Merit
Commanders of the Ordre national du Mérite
Deputy Chiefs of Navy (Australia)
Living people
Officers of the Order of Australia
People from the Gold Coast, Queensland
Recipients of the Conspicuous Service Medal
Recipients of the Pingat Jasa Gemilang (Tentera)
Royal Australian Navy admirals